Vincent Petrus Anna Sebastiaan Janssen (born 15 June 1994) is a Dutch professional footballer who plays as a forward for Belgian Pro League club Antwerp.

Club career

Early career
Janssen started playing at the amateur branch of TOP, after which he became part of the youth academy of the professional branch of the club. Through a merger of the TOP and N.E.C. academies, he became part of the academy of NEC. From NEC, he transferred to Feyenoord youth teams, winning the U19s national title with Feyenoord in 2013.

After being released by Feyenoord, he joined Eerste Divisie team Almere City in 2013. He made his debut for Almere on 3 August 2013 in a 3–2 home defeat against Volendam. After netting ten goals in the 2013–14 season, he reached 19 goals the following season. He scored 32 goals in 74 appearances in all competitions for Almere.

AZ
After two seasons with Almere, Janssen moved to Eredivisie side AZ in 2015, signing a contract with the club until 2019. He scored his first official goal for the club against İstanbul Başakşehir in a UEFA Europa League qualifier on 30 July 2015. His first goal in the Eredivisie was on 4 October 2015, where he scored the first and second goal in a 3–1 home win against Twente. After failing to score in his first eight matches for the club, he went on to score 20 league goals in the second half of the season – the first player to achieve this feat in 52 years – and became the top scorer of the Eredivisie with a total of 27 goals. This also made him the youngest player to score more than 25 goals in an Eredivisie season since Ronaldo in the 1994–95 season. His first hat-trick for AZ was on 24 January 2016, in a 4–2 home win against former club Feyenoord. He also scored four goals in a 5–1 home win against PEC Zwolle on 16 April 2016. He was awarded the 2016 Johan Cruyff Trophy, the Dutch "Talent of the Year" award.

Tottenham Hotspur
On 12 July 2016, Janssen joined Premier League side Tottenham Hotspur for £17 million (€20 million) on a four-year contract. Manager Mauricio Pochettino had seen Janssen during a Netherlands friendly with the Republic of Ireland, saying Janssen "ticked all the boxes we needed". With his signing, he became the most expensive player sold by AZ Alkmaar in their football history.

Janssen played in three friendlies for Tottenham before the 2016–17 season, providing a goal and an assist in the final game against Inter Milan. Janssen made his Premier League debut on 13 August, coming on as a substitute for Eric Dier against Everton. He made his first start the next week at home to Crystal Palace, playing at forward the full 90 minutes. Following an ankle injury to star Harry Kane on 18 September, Janssen was thrust into a larger role for the club, with Pochettino stating "this is a big opportunity for him to show what he can do". He scored his first goal for the club on 21 September 2016, converting a penalty in a 5–0 victory in the EFL Cup against Gillingham. His first Premier League goal, another penalty, was on 29 October in a 1–1 draw with Leicester City. He scored his first goal from open play for Tottenham on 12 March 2017, scoring the fifth goal in a 6–0 FA Cup Quarter Final win over Millwall. On 4 September 2017, it was confirmed that Janssen had been omitted from Spurs' Champions League squad for the 2017–18 campaign.

On 8 September 2017, Janssen joined Süper Lig club Fenerbahçe for the season. He scored his first goal for the club in a 4–1 win over Alanyaspor, and a second in the Istanbul derby against Beşiktaş that resulted in a 2–1 win. However, he was injured against Bursaspor in early December, and was out of action for a few months.

In summer 2018 Janssen returned to Tottenham but at the beginning of the 2018–19 season he was not issued a number. Spurs reported on their website that Janssen had surgery for a foot injury and would be in recovery with the club's medical staff. After being out for most of the season Janssen made a substitute appearance and a return to first team football for Spurs against Brighton on 23 April 2019.

Monterrey
On 23 July 2019, Liga MX club Monterrey announced that they had signed Janssen on a permanent deal.
He made his official debut on 17 August coming in as a substitute for Rogelio Funes Mori in a 2–0 win against Toluca, and a week later he scored his first goal in Mexican football against Santos Laguna.

He scored his first hat-trick for the club on 5 November in a Copa MX group stage match against Chiapas.

He proved to be a vital part of the team as he helped Monterrey win the Apertura 2019 finals against América. Coming on as substitute in the second leg, he managed to score in the eventual penalty shoot-out as Monterrey won their first title since 2010, his first league title.

Royal Antwerp
On 18 June 2022, Janssen joined Belgian side Royal Antwerp on a four-year deal. He made his league debut for the club on 24 July, in a 2–0 win over K.V. Mechelen on the first matchday of the 2022–23 Belgian First Division A season.

International career
Janssen received his first call up to the senior Netherlands team in March 2016 for friendlies against France and England. In his first international start, a 1–2 win against England on 29 March 2016, he scored his first senior international goal and provided his first assist on the other.

In May 2022, Janssen received a call up from coach Louis van Gaal for UEFA Nations League fixtures, ending a nearly five-year hiatus from the national team. In November, he was included in the 2022 FIFA World Cup squad. On the 12th March 2023, Janssen retired from international football citing the fact that he wanted to focus on his club career.

Style of play

A two-footed player, Janssen is credited with good finishing, movement and pace. Due to his strength, he is an "exceptional" hold-up man who can bring teammates into play, and as a good passer of the ball, he can set up goal-scoring opportunities for teammates. He is also praised for his work ethic, as well as his competitive mentality. Janssen's style of play has invited comparisons with Ruud van Nistelrooy.

His weaknesses are shots from outside the penalty box, the timing of his movement and ball control.

Personal life
Janssen is the son of Annemarie Verstappen, a former world champion swimmer and Dutch Sportswoman of the year. He was awarded the 2016 Johan Cruyff Trophy, the Dutch "Talent of the Year" award.

Career statistics

Club

International

Scores and results list Netherlands' goal tally first, score column indicates score after each Janssen goal.

Honours
Monterrey
Liga MX: Apertura 2019
Copa MX: 2019–20
CONCACAF Champions League: 2021

Individual
Eredivisie top scorer: 2015–16
Johan Cruyff Trophy: 2015–16
Copa MX Top Scorer: 2019–20

References

External links

 Vincent Janssen at Voetbal International 
 Netherlands profile at OnsOranje
 
 

1994 births
Living people
People from Bernheze
Dutch footballers
Netherlands youth international footballers
Netherlands under-21 international footballers
Netherlands international footballers
Association football forwards
Almere City FC players
AZ Alkmaar players
Tottenham Hotspur F.C. players
Fenerbahçe S.K. footballers
C.F. Monterrey players
Royal Antwerp F.C. players
Eerste Divisie players
Eredivisie players
Premier League players
Süper Lig players
Liga MX players
Belgian Pro League players
2022 FIFA World Cup players
Dutch expatriate footballers
Expatriate footballers in England
Expatriate footballers in Turkey
Expatriate footballers in Mexico
Expatriate footballers in Belgium
Dutch expatriate sportspeople in England
Dutch expatriate sportspeople in Turkey
Dutch expatriate sportspeople in Mexico
Dutch expatriate sportspeople in Belgium
Footballers from North Brabant